This article provides details of international football games played by the Oman national football team from 2020 to present.

Results

2021

2022

2023

Head to head records

References

Football in Oman
Oman national football team results
2020s in Omani sport